Lake Sherwood is a  reservoir located within the Lake Sherwood Recreation Area of the Monongahela National Forest in Greenbrier County, West Virginia, USA. The recreation area surrounding Lake Sherwood contains camping and picnicking facilities as well as a non-fossil fuel boating site and a beach for swimmers. It also includes several easy hikes, some with attractive lake views.  The lake is located near community of Neola and covers most of the farmland of Richard Rider and Jane Dixon Rider who settled the land around 1790.

External links
Lake Sherwood Recreation Area

Protected areas of Greenbrier County, West Virginia
Sherwood, Lake
Monongahela National Forest
Bodies of water of Greenbrier County, West Virginia